Tomislav Brkić and Ante Pavić were the defending champions but only Brkić chose to defend his title, partnering Andrea Pellegrino. Brkić lost in the first round to Sergio Martos Gornés and Felipe Meligeni Alves.

Ariel Behar and Andrey Golubev won the title after defeating Andrés Molteni and Hugo Nys 7–5, 6–4 in the final.

Seeds

Draw

References

External links
 Main draw

Internazionali di Tennis del Friuli Venezia Giulia - Doubles
2020 Doubles